Plestiodon brevirostris, the short-nosed skink, is a species of lizard endemic to Mexico.

Description 
P.Brevirostris can reach a snout-to-vent length (SVL) of 129.8 mm, but on average is around 59.3-62.4 mm. It has a stout olive-gray body, with two dorsolateral light stripes from snout to hind legs, as well as dark brownish-black stripes on the side. The short-nosed skink’s belly is pigmented and speckled with scattered dark dots. The male’s supralabials are reddish. Fully grown adults have a red or brown (ground color) tail, unlike juvenile tails, which are metallic blue.

Reproduction 
The short-nosed skink is ovoviviparous.

Habitat 
Short-nosed skinks are endemic to Mexico, and can be found in Guerrero Morelos, Oaxaca, Veracruz, Puebla, MIchoacan, and Nayarit. They live in forests and shrublands at high elevations.

Entomology 
The specific name Brevirostris was named after the latin “brevis”, meaning short, and “rostrum” which means beak/proboscis.

References

brevirostris
Reptiles of Mexico
Reptiles described in 1860
Taxa named by Albert Günther